Zedekiah Silloway Stanton (May 1, 1848 – August 15, 1921) was an attorney and judge who served as the 44th lieutenant governor of Vermont from 1902 to 1904.

Early life
Zed S. Stanton was born in Roxbury, Vermont on May 1, 1848, the son of George B. Stanton and Lucretia Silloway. He was educated in Roxbury and graduated from Northfield High School.  Stanton worked for the Vermont Central Railroad and taught school for several years. He then studied law with Congressman Frank Plumley and two other local lawyers, was admitted to the bar in 1880, and became an attorney in Roxbury.

Political career
Stanton was active in the Republican Party and served in several local offices, including Justice of the Peace, Town Meeting Moderator, Town Clerk and Treasurer, School Superintendent, and school board member.  He also served as Washington County Assistant Judge from 1884 to 1888.

He was elected to the Vermont House of Representatives in 1884 and 1886.  From 1890 to 1896 he was Washington County State's Attorney; he was succeeded by Fred A. Howland. He served as a state Railroad Commissioner from 1896 to 1898 and was Commission Chairman from 1897 to 1898.  Stanton won election to the Vermont Senate in 1900. In 1902 he won election as Lieutenant Governor and served until 1904.  Because a Local Option candidate made the election a three-way race Stanton with 47.2% did not receive the popular vote majority required by the Vermont constitution, so he was officially chosen by the state legislature.

In 1908 Stanton was narrowly defeated for the Republican nomination for Governor by George H. Prouty.

Later career
After losing the nomination for Governor Stanton was elected by the Vermont Assembly to serve as a Judge of the Superior Court, filling the vacancy created when Chief Judge Seneca Haselton was appointed to the Vermont Supreme Court and the other Superior judges advanced in seniority. He remained on the bench until his death, and attained by seniority the position of chief judge of the Superior Court.  He was succeeded as chief judge by Fred M. Butler, who later served as an associate justice of the Vermont Supreme Court.  He was succeeded as a judge on the Superior Court by Julius A. Willcox, who also later served on the Vermont Supreme Court.

Death and burial
Stanton died in Roxbury on August 15, 1921.  He was buried in Roxbury Cemetery.

Other
In 1895 Stanton received an honorary master's degree from Norwich University.

References 

1848 births
1921 deaths
Vermont lawyers
State's attorneys in Vermont
Republican Party members of the Vermont House of Representatives
Republican Party Vermont state senators
Lieutenant Governors of Vermont
People from Roxbury, Vermont
Vermont state court judges
Norwich University alumni
Burials in Vermont
19th-century American lawyers